A list of Western films released in the 1930s.

1930
Western